James Earl (May 1, 1761 – August 18, 1796) was an American painter and younger brother of fellow portrait painter Ralph Earl. He was born in Leicester, Massachusetts, and died of yellow fever in Charleston, South Carolina. He lived and worked in London for ten years, where he married and had three children and enrolled in the Royal Academy in 1789. His British clientele were mostly Loyalists living in exile, though there is no evidence that he was a committed Loyalist himself. Among his best known works are Rebecca Pritchard Mills and Her Daughter Eliza Shrewsbury (ca. 1795) and a portrait of Charles Cotesworth Pinckney.

References

1761 births
1796 deaths
18th-century American painters
18th-century American male artists
American male painters
American portrait painters
People from Leicester, Massachusetts
Deaths from yellow fever